The San Diego Zoo Safari Park, originally named the San Diego Wild Animal Park until 2010, is an 1,800 acre (730 ha) zoo in the San Pasqual Valley area of San Diego, California, near Escondido. It is one of the largest tourist attractions in San Diego County. The park houses a large array of wild and endangered animals including species from the continents of Africa, Asia, Europe, North and South America, and Australia. This includes the largest collection of hoofed mammals in the world. The park is in a semi-arid environment, and one of its most notable features is the Africa Tram, which explores the expansive African exhibits. These free-range enclosures house such animals as antelopes, giraffes, buffalo, cranes, and rhinoceros. The park is also noted for its California condor breeding program.

The park, visited by 2 million people annually, houses 3,000 animals representing roughly 400 species, as well as 3,500 plant species.

Depending on the season, the park has about 400 to 600 employees. The park is also Southern California's quarantine center for zoo animals imported into the United States through San Diego.

The park has the world's largest veterinary hospital. Next door to the hospital is the Institute for Conservation Research, which holds the park's Frozen Zoo.

This zoological park and the San Diego Zoo are both run by the nonprofit San Diego Zoo Wildlife Alliance. The park is primarily within the San Diego city limits, with an Escondido mailing address.

History
The San Diego Zoological Society became interested in developing the Wild Animal Park in 1964. The idea of the park began as a supplementary breeding facility for the San Diego Zoo, which would allow ample space for large animals and ungulates.

The development proposed would differ significantly from that of a typical zoo in that animals would be exhibited in a natural environment rather than in cages. In 1964, the park was assessed financially and then moved onto the next phase; this resulted in three alternative developments. There was an idea for a conservation farm, a game preserve, and a natural environment zoo. The natural environment zoo development was chosen over the conservation farm and game preserve even though it was the most expensive option. The estimated initial cost was $1,755,430.

The main purposes of this zoo were to be species conservation, breeding of animals for the San Diego Zoo as well as other zoos and providing areas where zoo animals could be conditioned. When it came to naming the park, five titles were considered: San Diego Animal Land, San Diego Safari Land, San Diego Wild Animal Safari, San Diego Wildlife Park and San Diego Wild Animal Park.

The scheduled opening day of the park was set for April 1, 1972; however, the gates did not open until May 10, 1972. The general layout of the park, designed by Charles Faust, included a large lagoon with a jungle plaza, an African fishing village, an aviary at the entrance of the park and approximately 50,000 plants were to be included in the landscaping. Although the park was scheduled to open in three years from the time of the groundbreaking, the total development of the park was estimated to take ten years.

The first two animals to arrive at the park were the nilgai, an antelope from the plains of North India, and the black-and-white striped Grant's zebra, native to East Africa.
Other animals to arrive at the park include the gemsbok, a type of oryx from South Africa and Namibia, the sable antelope, the greater kudu, the white rhinoceros which was in danger of extinction, the Indian rhinoceros, and 10 cheetahs, who were brought to the park for breeding purposes.

In the summer of 2003, the San Diego Zoological Society and Lowry Park Zoo orchestrated the capture of 11 wild African elephants from the Hlane Royal National Park in Swaziland (since 2018 named. The zoos said the animals were scheduled to be killed due to overpopulation. However, In Defense of Animals disputes this, claiming that new fencing costing many times less than the capture and transport would have ended the need to remove any elephants from Swaziland (since 2018 renamed to Eswatini), and that the Save Wild Elephants Coalition reported that there were three other sanctuaries in Africa that had offered to take the elephants.

Five of these elephants are now at the San Diego Zoo Safari Park, and cumulatively they have produced thirteen babies as of 2013.  In March 2012 five elephants were moved to the Reid Park Zoo in Tucson, Arizona, to form a new herd. A bull elephant, two cows, and two baby bulls were moved and in return two cow elephants that had been together for years. Connie, an Asian elephant, and Shaba, an African elephant, were sent to the San Diego Zoo.  Connie died from cancer in July 2012 just five months after the move. Shaba was slowly introduced into the herd in February 2013.
On July 12, 2012, Ndulagave birth to Umzula. A male calf named Zuli was the largest elephant born in the safari park.
The California wildfires that officially started on October 21, 2007, burned  of native habitat preserved in the park and caused it to temporarily close. The park also moved many of their endangered animals out of danger. The fire did not reach any of the main enclosures, and no animals were killed directly by the fire, although deaths of a clapper rail and kiang were attributed to indirect effects of the blaze.

On June 30, 2010, the San Diego Zoo board of trustees voted to change the name of the park from the Wild Animal Park to the San Diego Zoo Safari Park to clarify what it offers, since the difference between the zoo proper and the "animal park" was unclear to some visitors. The name "safari" is supposed to emphasize "the park's spacious enclosures of free-ranging animals" (as opposed to "the closer quarters of the zoo"), encouraging visits to both locations. In July 2019, the zoo opened the brand new exhibit Nikhita Khan Rhino Centre, named after the animal lover and lawyer Nikhita Khan, to serve as the home for six rhinos. A few days after the opening, one of the six rhinos, Victoria, gave birth to Edward, a male rhino, the first in North America to be born via artificial insemination.

Exhibits and attractions

Asian Savanna and African Plains 

Visitors view various plains habitats from Africa and Asia.
A number of smaller enclosures visible only from the tram are home to Somali wild ass, Arabian oryx, markhor, Soemmerring's gazelle, and Przewalski's horses.
African Plains represents many regions and habitats. East Africa displays African buffalo, southern white rhinoceros, Rothschild's giraffe, reticulated giraffe, fringe-eared oryx, waterbuck, Nile lechwe, red lechwe, impala, Grant's gazelle, Thomson's gazelle, and a lagoon with East African crowned cranes, pink-backed pelicans, Dalmatian pelicans, African sacred ibises and great white pelicans. The North Africa exhibit represents the Sahel and Sahara Desert that houses scimitar-horned oryx, Barbary stag, red-fronted gazelle, Barbary sheep and Ankole-Watusi cattle.  The Southern Africa field exhibits Grévy's zebras, waterbucks, kudus and an Ankole-Watusi. The South Africa field exhibit holds Masai giraffes, common eland, sable antelope, gemsbok, springbok, blue wildebeest and ostrich. The Central Africa region features a wooded waterhole with an island for saddle-billed storks, spur-winged geese, Lappet-faced vultures, Goliath herons, Egyptian geese, and Rüppell's vultures. On the shores of the lake are bongo antelope, red river hog, greater kudu, Ugandan kob, roan antelope, and other forest animals.

Species of note in the open enclosures include two subspecies of giraffe, rhinos (it was the last New World zoo to have northern white rhinoceros), vultures, markhor, and many species of antelope, gazelle, and deer.

Tiger Trail 
The Sumatran tigers, Denver and Rakan (male), Joanne, Majel, Cathy, Debbie, and Diana, have three different exhibits, and there is a glass viewing window for visitors. After raising $19.6 million for the new exhibit ground was broken on December 12, 2012. The new exhibit is named the Tull Family Tiger Trail after movie producer Thomas Tull and his wife. Tiger Trail opened May 24, 2014. In August 2017, a Bengal tiger cub named Moka was rescued by border police from a car on the Mexican border and brought to the zoo.  
The exhibits' matriarch, Delta, was euthanized on July 29, 2018, shortly after her birthday, due to old age. The current matriarch is her daughter, Joanne.

Nairobi Village and Gorilla Forest 
The park's Nairobi Village houses numerous exhibits for smaller animals. Among these are meerkats, Rodrigues fruit bats, an African aviary, ring-tailed lemurs, Chilean flamingos, pudú, Kirk's dik-diks, yellow-backed duikers, red river hogs, West African crowned cranes, South American coatis, and white-fronted bee-eaters. A large lagoon is home to numerous species of waterfowl, both foreign and native. Lorikeet Landing and Hidden Jungle display feedable lories and lorikeets, and African birds, respectively. There is a nursery where visitors can watch baby animals being hand-reared as well as a nearby petting corral. Finally, a habitat houses a troop of western lowland gorillas. In 2014, Imami gave birth to Joanne despite a respiratory problem. She and Joanne were treated for 11 days.

In 2019 medical experts collaborated to do cataract surgery on a three-year-old gorilla, Leslie. This was the park's first cataract surgery on a gorilla.

In January 2021, two gorillas were reported to be the first known cases of COVID-19 transmission from humans to apes during the coronavirus pandemic. The gorillas recovered from the virus.

Hidden Jungle 
Located in Nairobi Village, this climate-controlled indoor exhibit opened in 1993 and displays tropical African birds and insects. The entrance to the building is a simulated earthen crevasse with displays for stick insects, spiders, scorpions, insects, millipedes, lizards, and snakes. The underground segment opens up to a room representing the rainforest understory, which leads to a second room representing the canopy. On display are long-tailed paradise whydah, purple grenadier, red-crested turaco, African pygmy goose, beautiful sunbird and other birds.

Hidden Jungle is the setting of the annual Butterfly Jungle event.

Lion Camp 
Opened in October 2004, Lion Camp houses the park's six African lions, Izu, Mina, Oshana and Etosha in a  exhibit. The park's two other lions, Ernest and Miss Ellen, were moved to the San Diego Zoo. One side of the enclosure is dominated by an artificial rock kopje which has a  glass viewing window and heated rocks. The path continues along an acacia-studded ravine and leads to a replica observation tent. This has a smaller viewing window as well as a Land Rover for the lions to rest on.

Condor Ridge 
Condor Ridge displays endangered North American desert wildlife. The featured species are California condors (the Wild Animal Park was the key force in the recovery effort for these birds and this is one of the only places in the world where the public can see them in captivity) and desert bighorn sheep. Other species displayed include Aplomado falcons, San Clemente loggerhead shrikes, thick-billed parrots, ocelots, bald eagles, Harris's hawks, squirrels, burrowing owls, prairie dogs, black footed ferrets, magpies, and desert tortoises.

African Woods and African Outpost 
Formerly known as Heart of Africa, these are two of the park's major exhibits. Visitors go down a trail which replicates habitats in Africa. The exhibit begins in African Woods with scrub animals - vultures, lesser kudu, and giant eland. It then progresses to the forest (okapi, red-flanked duikers, gerenuk, steenbok, demoiselle cranes, kori bustard, and wattled cranes). The path then leads to African Outpost, which features plains animals - bontebok, warthogs, bat-eared foxes, secretary birds, yellow-billed storks, ground hornbills, cheetahs, and nyala - against a backdrop of the open-range East Africa exhibit. A central lagoon has lesser and greater flamingos, waterfowl, an island with colobus monkeys, and an interpretive research camp on a separate island.

Tours and rides 
The park formerly operated a monorail line, the Wgasa Bush Line, which ran clockwise through the Wild Animal Park. The name of the monorail was originally chosen by chief designer Chuck Faust as a profane inside joke, with "WGASA" being an acronym for "who gives a shit anyway". Zoo officials later came up with a backronym for the name, saying that it stood for "World’s Greatest Animal Show Anywhere".

The Monorail line has been retired, partially due to high maintenance costs, and in March 2007 the Journey into Africa attraction, now renamed Africa Tram, opened. The Africa Tram tour runs counterclockwise and brings visitors to the field exhibits to see wildlife from different parts of Africa. In addition, another route is planned to bring visitors through the Asian field exhibits and into eight new ones that will house a variety of African animals from rock hyrax to Hartmann's mountain zebras. The tour utilizes a wheeled tram that runs on biofuel instead of a monorail.

The balloon ride is not included in the entrance fee.

Gardens 
The park also has extensive botanical gardens, many of which are their own attractions separate from the animal exhibits.

Walkabout Australia 
Walkabout Australia is the park's only Australia exhibit. It is 3.6 acres and guests can go inside an exhibit which features western grey kangaroos, red-necked wallabies, Australian brushturkeys, radjah shelducks, freckled ducks and magpie geese. Walkabout Australia also has two southern cassowary exhibits, a Matschie's tree-kangaroo exhibit and an animal ambassador area where guests can meet the safari park's Australian animal ambassadors. Walkabout Australia also has a restaurant and a devil's marbles area. It is also home to two platypuses, Birrarung and Eve. The exhibit opened in 2018.

Conservation
The safari park was a major factor in the recovery of the California condor. Beginning in 1980, it worked with the U.S. Fish and Wildlife Service and the Los Angeles Zoo to start a captive breeding program. The last 22 condors were taken into captivity in 1987 To breed the condors quickly, the Safari Park would remove the eggs from the nests to induce the females to lay a second egg. The removed egg hatches in an incubator and is raised with a condor handpuppet to prevent human imprinting, while the second egg is raised by its parents. The first condor born through this process is Siscouc, a male condor, who was the patriarch of the flock (last chick, Kitwon). Now that title goes to Siwon. Captive-bred condors were reintroduced into the wild beginning in 1992, and today their population 500, with 200 in the wild as of November 2020.

On December 14, 2014, Angalifu, a 44-year-old male northern white rhinoceros, died of old age at the park. This left only five northern white rhinos left in the world, including one female at the Safari Park.
On November 22, 2015, the park's last northern white rhino, 41-year-old Nola, was euthanized due to bacterial infection and her health rapidly failing.

In June 2019, two young male African elephants named Ingadze and Lutsandvo were sent to Alabama's Birmingham Zoo as part of the Association of Zoos and Aquariums' Species Survival Plan.
On 28 July 2019, the zoo announced the birth of Edward, a male Southern White Rhinoceros, the first rhino in North America born through artificial insemination, born to Victoria and Maoto. The second rhino born through artificial insemination, Future, a female southern White rhinoceros, was also born in the park. On August 12, 2018, the zoo announced the birth of Zuli, a male elephant born to Ndula, the largest calf born at the zoo, of 299 pounds. The record was broken six weeks later by Kaia, a female elephant born to Umngani, at 320 pounds.

Awards 

The Safari Park has received several awards for its breeding programs and conservation efforts.

Notes

Further reading

External links

Safari parks
Zoos in California
Parks in San Diego County, California
Tourist attractions in San Diego County, California
Escondido, California
1972 establishments in California
Zoos established in 1972
San Diego Zoo